Stardust is an album by jazz musician John Coltrane which was released in July 1963 by Prestige Records. It was assembled from two separate sessions at the studio of Rudy Van Gelder in Hackensack, New Jersey in 1958.

Reception

In a review for AllMusic, Alex Henderson wrote: "Stardust contains some highlights of two bop-oriented Coltrane dates from 1958... At both sessions, Coltrane's playing is quite engaging. He is a lyrical, expressive ballad player on 'Then I'll Be Tired of You,' 'Stardust,' and 'Time After Time,' but he swings fast and aggressively on 'Love Thy Neighbor'...  Coltrane is well served by Garland's piano and Chambers' bass... Although not quite essential, Stardust paints a consistently attractive picture of Coltrane's 1958 output."

Track listing
 "Stardust" (Hoagy Carmichael, Mitchell Parish) – 10:44
 "Time After Time" (Sammy Cahn, Jule Styne) – 7:45
 "Love Thy Neighbor" (Mack Gordon, Harry Revel) – 9:21
 "Then I'll Be Tired of You" (Yip Harburg, Arthur Schwartz) – 9:27

Personnel
 John Coltrane – tenor saxophone
 Wilbur Harden – flugelhorn (track 1), trumpet (3)
 Freddie Hubbard - trumpet (4)
 Red Garland – piano
 Paul Chambers – bass
 Jimmy Cobb – drums (1, 3)
 Arthur Taylor – drums (2, 4)

References 

1963 albums
John Coltrane albums
Prestige Records albums